"My Girl's Pussy" (or "Pussy!" as the title appears, capitalized, on the label of its original  78 rpm record) is a song by the British bandleader and clarinetist Harry Roy. The song was recorded in 1931 by Harry Roy and His Bat Club Boys.

The lyrics play on the two meanings of the word pussy (i.e. cat/female genitalia) in a series of double entendres.

Harry Roy is credited for both the lyrics and the music; he performed the clarinet part and the singing.

Release 
The song was released in August 1931 by Oriole Records (UK) described by the record company as a "fox trot with vocal chorus". It was the A-side of the record, with 'If You Haven't Got Love' on the  B-side.

The track duration is approximately 3 minutes 10.

The song, written in C minor, has a medium tempo (with an average of 103 BPM). It opens on sounds imitating a cat’s meowing (after a few bars),  followed by the theme played on the clarinet before the vocal part starts, developed  in two sequences separated by a piano solo.

Background 
The song was performed by Roy and his ad hoc orchestra at The Bat club on Albermarle Street, where it became the club's "unofficial anthem" in the early 1930s.

On more recent genre compilations 
"My Girl's Pussy" later appeared on various dirty blues compilation albums, such as The Copulatin' Blues, Volume Two, The Ultimate Dirty Blues collection, Risqué blues (vol.1) or Baby How Can It Be? Songs of Love, Lust and Contempt From the 1920s and 1930s.

Cover versions
"My Girl's Pussy" was covered in 1976 by Ian Whitcomb, in 1978 by R. Crumb & His Cheap Suit Serenaders, in 1981 by Bob Kerr and His Whoopee Band, in 2004 by Kitten on the Keys, and in 2007 by Blag Dahlia among others.

Use in films and series 
"My Girl's Pussy" was on the soundtrack of the 2004 film Head in the Clouds, performed by John Duigan. Its cover version by R. Crumb and his Cheap Suit Serenaders was used as the theme song to the Australian Broadcasting Corporations's series Laid in 2011–12. It was sung by the character of Ben Siegel during his capture/kidnapping in the 5th season of Boardwalk Empire (2015).

The song appears in the 2022 film Babylon, in the first sequence, sung by Lady Fay Zhu, a character based upon Anna May Wong and portrayed by Li Jun Li. Its original version also can be heard partially during a later scene of the film, during which the song is played on a phonograph in a subterranean gathering space.

See also 
 1931 in British music; 1931 in jazz
 Babylon (film soundtrack)

Notes

References

1931 songs
Hokum blues songs
Songs about cats
Erotica
British jazz songs
Songs about sexuality
1931 singles
Vocal jazz songs
Compositions for clarinet